Aragonian may be:
 a somewhat rare adjective form of Aragon
 a name mostly used in Spanish contexts for a geologic age roughly corresponding to the Astaracian

See also 
 Argonian (disambiguation)
 Aragonese (disambiguation)